Odessa High School is a public high school in unincorporated New Castle County, Delaware. It has a Townsend postal address, while its name refers to nearby Odessa. It is a part of the Appoquinimink School District. The ducks are the mascot.

It is a part of the Fairview K-12 Campus, which is on a former corn field and also includes the Old State Elementary School and Spring Meadow Early Childhood Center. It shares its building with Cantwell's Bridge Middle School.

History
The Appoquinimink district began developing the complex circa 2010.

The district selected the duck mascot in 2017. The building had a cost of $148 million. Groundbreaking began in January 2018.

Construction completed in fall 2020 and opened with grade 9 students. As the COVID-19 pandemic in Delaware occurred, the initial students did virtual learning. The athletic teams began in November 2020.

References

External links
 

High schools in New Castle County, Delaware
Public high schools in Delaware